Mount Singgalang (Gunung Singgalang in Indonesian) is a volcano in West Sumatra, Indonesia, about 10 km to the southwest of the town of Bukittinggi. Its elevation is 2,877 m (9,439 ft). It is a twin volcano with Mount Tandikat, which is located to the south-south-west of Singgalang. However, only Tandikat has had historical volcanic activity. Bukittinggi and the smaller town of Padang Panjang are located towards the east of the mountain.

There are two lakes at the summit named Dewi (Goddess) and Kumbang (Beetle).

References

External links
 

Inactive volcanoes
Landforms of West Sumatra
Mountains of Sumatra
Stratovolcanoes of Indonesia
Subduction volcanoes
Volcanoes of Sumatra